Ban Thaen is the northeasternmost district (amphoe) of Chaiyaphum province, northeastern Thailand.

History
Tambon Sam Suan, Ban Tao, and Ban Thaen were separated from Phu Khiao District to create Ban Thaen minor district (king amphoe) on 16 June 1965. It was upgraded to a full district on 25 February 1969.

Geography
Neighboring districts are (from the southwest clockwise): Kaeng Khro and Phu Khiao of Chaiyaphum Province; Nong Ruea and Mancha Khiri of Khon Kaen province.

Administration
The district is divided into five subdistricts (tambons), which are further subdivided into 66 villages (mubans). The township (thesaban tambon) Ban Thaen covers parts of tambon Ban Thaen. There are a further five tambon administrative organizations (TAO).

References

External links
amphoe.com

Districts of Chaiyaphum province
1965 establishments in Thailand